Anglia may refer to:

Places
 England, in medieval Latin and several other languages
 Places settled by the Angles:
 In North Germany:
 Anglia (peninsula), original home of the Angles in north Germany
In England in the early Middle Ages:
 Most often, East Anglia and, in particular, the Kingdom of East Anglia
 Mid Anglia (disambiguation)
 West Anglia (disambiguation) and,  
 Sometimes, especially in medieval contexts, areas to the north also settled by Angles, including the kingdoms of Mercia, Lindsey, Deira and Northumbria

Companies
 Anglia Television or ITV Anglia, the ITV regional franchise in the east of England
 Anglia Regional Co-operative Society Ltd.
 Anglia Building Society, now part of the Nationwide Building Society
 Anglia Railways, a railway company

Other
 Anglia Ruskin University
 University of East Anglia
 Anglia (journal), subtitled Zeitschrift für Englische Philologie, a German journal of English studies
 Anglia, a British propaganda magazine published in Russian language between 1962 and 1992 
 Ford Anglia, various models of car built by the Ford Motor Company
 Anglia knight, a sterling silver trophy depicting a knight on horseback used as the ident for ITV Anglia

See also
 West Anglia (disambiguation)
 Mid Anglia (disambiguation)